Green Nunatak is a nunatak rising to approximately  at the northern extreme of the Wallabies Nunataks, west of the Churchill Mountains of Antarctica. It was named in honor of E. N. Green, a member of the 1964 Cape Hallett winter-over team, working as a technician on the geomagnetic project.

References

Nunataks of Oates Land